Wrząca may refer to the following places:
Wrząca, Pabianice County in Łódź Voivodeship (central Poland)
Wrząca, Sieradz County in Łódź Voivodeship (central Poland)
Wrząca, Masovian Voivodeship (east-central Poland)
Wrząca, Czarnków-Trzcianka County in Greater Poland Voivodeship (west-central Poland)
Wrząca, Kalisz County in Greater Poland Voivodeship (west-central Poland)
Wrząca, Turek County in Greater Poland Voivodeship (west-central Poland)
Wrząca, Pomeranian Voivodeship (north Poland)